This is a list of organisations that aim to support individuals that have renounced Islam sorted by date of founding.

See also 
Apostasy in Islam
Apostasy in Islam by country
Ex-Muslims
List of former Muslims

References

External links 

 
Islam-related lists
Ex-Muslim
Lists of religious organizations